Elachista hedionella is a moth of the family Elachistidae. It is found in the United States, where it has been recorded from Michigan.

References

hedionella
Moths described in 1999
Moths of North America